Holberton may refer to:

Betty Holberton (1917–2001), American computer programmer

See also
Halberton, a village in Devon, England
Holbeton, a village in Devon, England